Cornelius William John Hardy (or Hardey) (born 1831 or 1833, date of death unknown) was a convict transported to Western Australia, later to become one of the colony's ex-convict school teachers.

Cornelius Hardy was born in the early 1830s. Erickson claims 1831, but other records state that he was 23 years old in 1856. In that year, he was working as a clerk in the General Post Office when he and two other clerks were caught stealing money from letters. On 9 March 1856, Hardy was sentenced to fourteen years' transportation. He arrived in Western Australia on board the Nile in January 1858. After receiving his ticket of leave, he was employed as a tutor by another convict, Frederick Morrell, before being appointed government schoolteacher at Northam in 1865. Attendance at the school dwindled and the school was eventually closed. Hardy then found other work in Northam, and was later elected to the committee of the Northam Mechanics' Institute.

References

 

1831 births
Year of death unknown
Convicts transported to Western Australia
Settlers of Western Australia
Australian schoolteachers
Place of birth missing
Place of death missing